Igor Stepanov may refer to:

Igor Stepanov (ice hockey) (born 1970), Soviet and Russian ice hockey player
Igors Stepanovs (born 1966), Soviet and Latvian football player
Igors Stepanovs (born 1976), Latvian football player